Mitrocomidae is an accepted family in the order Leptothecata.

References

 
Leptothecata
Taxa named by Ernst Haeckel